This is a list of prime ministers of the Netherlands by higher education since 20th century. Of the twenty-three prime ministers since 1901 eight had doctorates and five served as university professors and the other five served as visiting professors. Four Cort van der Linden, Gerbrandy, Beel and Van Agt were legal scholars.

Prime ministers by higher education

See also
 Prime Minister of the Netherlands
 List of prime ministers of the Netherlands
 Historical rankings of prime ministers of the Netherlands
 Religious affiliations of prime ministers of the Netherlands

References

Netherlands